Alexander Ivanovich Litvinov (22 August 1853 – 1932) was a general in the Imperial Russian Army.

Biography
Litvinov was educated in the 1st Moscow military school and entered military service on August 5, 1870. He graduated from the 3rd Military Alexandrovskoye and Mikhaylovskoye Artillery School in 1873. He was appointed a lieutenant (August 10, 1873) in the 1st Horse-Artillery Brigade. He then served in the 2nd Cavalry Artillery team.

He fought in the Russian-Turkish War of 1877–1878, attaining the rank of captain on December 18, 1880. In 1882 he graduated from the Academy of General Staff of the Mykolayiv. He then went to the Vilensky Military District. On November 24, 1882, he was appointed senior staff adjutant to the 4th Cavalry Division, attaining the rank of colonel on March 24, 1885. On September 29, 1886, he was appointed the chief of staff of the Vilno Military District. On April 19, 1890, he became chief of staff of the 2nd Cavalry Division. Then on June 12, 1896, he became commander of the 4th Pskov Dragoon Regiment. He attained the rank of major-general on June 23, 1899, and was given a special assignment with the Don Cossacks. On September 20, 1900, he was put in command of the Warsaw Military District. On November 9, 1906, he was once again made chief of staff of the Vilno Military District. He reached the rank of lieutenant-general on December 6, 1905, and was appointed head of the 1st Cavalry Division on October 9, 1906. On March 9, 1911, he became commander of the 5th Army Corps and General of Cavalry on December 6, 1911.

At the head of the 7th and 10th Infantry Division, he entered the First World War in the 5th Army. However, at a meeting of commanders held at Siedlce on November 17, 1914, he was appointed commander of the 1st Army, replacing General Paul von Rennenkampf. 

Litvinov's First Army participated in the Lake Naroch offensive.

After the February Revolution, he was dismissed from the service with uniform and pension. From 1918 he served in the Red Army.

Awards 

 Order of St. Stanislaus, 3rd Class, with Swords and Bow, 1879; 2nd Class, 1888; 1st Class, 1904
 Order of St. Anna, 3rd Class, 1883; 2nd Class, 1894; 1st Class, 1908
 Order of St. Vladimir, 4th Class, 1896; 3rd Class, 1902, 2nd Class with Swords, 29 March 1915
 Order of St. George, 4th Class, 25 September 1914
 Order of the White Eagle, with Swords, 6 December 1915

Reference

External links 

 Litvinov, Alexander Ivanovich Project "Russian Army in the Great War"
 Biography of A. I. Litvinov on the site "Russian Imperial Army"

1853 births
1932 deaths
Russian military leaders
Russian military personnel of World War I
Imperial Russian Army generals